Rokomari.com or Rokomari dot com is a Bangladeshi e-commerce site. It officially launched on 19 January 2012. Initially, it started selling only books, but now sells DVD, video tutorial, sporting goods, Onnorokom Science boxes (science testing kits), calculator, watch, pendrive, computer accessories, stationery and gift items. Users can order from the website, from mobile apps.

Rokomari operates as a marketplace. It works with publishers who sell their books on this platform. It does not publish any of the books it sells. Most of the books in available in this marketplace are written in Bengali and English, and a small number of books of other languages can be found here.

History 
Mahmudul Hasan Sohag, Abul Hasan Liton, Khairul Anam Ronnie, Ahteshamul Shams Rakib, and Jubair Bin Amin founded Rokomari on January 19, 2012. When the marketplace was started books were the only items, afterwards a number of new products, different electronics and stationery goods were added. 

Apart from books published in its homeland Bangladesh, it also sells foreign books, including several from West Bengal. Rokomari.com primarily sells books written in English and Bengali, though a minor portion of its books have been of other languages, for example, Spanish and Hindi. 

Since 2012, they introduced Cash on delivery for the users. Starting with only 100 books, this online bookstore now has over 0.2 million books. About one and a half to two thousand books are sold every day having 150 employees.

At present, Rokomari has on-site chatting facility, where users can ask their questions to Rokomari support agents. The website also offers sample reading for most of its books, so that potential customers can get a better idea of their desired Books.

Rokomari officially launched on 19 January 2012 with a team of around ten people, and a handful of publishers on its platform. Over the past 10 years, it has grown into one of the important players in online commerce, particularly in books. People can select from more than 200,000 books and 1000 publishers from this platform. The platform is built by an in-house team of Rokomari.

Rokomari marketplace 
Rokomari is an internet marketplace. They says that they neither promotes or deliberately holds any product back by artificial means such as arbitrary moderation. They do have a list of best seller books which is created based of the sales analytics of the platform. 

Rokomari follows a policy not to sell books that are illegal, banned by the Government of Bangladesh, attack or hurt the sentiment of Bangladesh Liberation War or the interest of the state of Bangladesh, hurt religious or group sentiment. If the subject of a book violates laws or hurts religious sentiment or an author is found involved in illegal activities, it removes and stops selling that book or books of that author immediately. In the past it has taken measures against several authors after receiving complaints against them. 

Rokomari has been delivering books across the country from day one of their lunch, now delivers books outside Bangladesh as well.

Publishers and authors 
There is a separate panel and an app for publishers where they can add and update book details. There are options to add upcoming books and open for pre-order. There are tools available for publishers to promote their books. Rokomari assists publishes on digital marketing services.

Authors can use the authors panel to know the status of their books. Rokomari hosts a number of online and offline events in collaboration with the authors.

Controversy 
In 2014 Rokomari.com has taken down Avijit Roy's books after its CEO received a death threat from a Farabi Shafiur Rahman.

References

External links 
 

2012 establishments
E-commerce
Bangladeshi websites